Haltichella is a genus of chalcidid wasps in the family Chalcididae. There are at least 20 described species in Haltichella.

Species
These 27 species belong to the genus Haltichella:

 Haltichella achterbergi Narendran, 1989 c g
 Haltichella bilobatus Schmitz, 1946 c g
 Haltichella burungae Schmitz, 1946 c g
 Haltichella cinchonica Narendran, 1989 c g
 Haltichella clavicornis (Ashmead, 1904) c g
 Haltichella delhensis Roy & Farooqi, 1984 c g
 Haltichella flavipes Schmitz, 1946 c g
 Haltichella hydara (Walker, 1842) c g
 Haltichella inermis Schmitz, 1946 c g
 Haltichella luzonica Masi, 1929 c g
 Haltichella macrocera Waterston, 1922 c g
 Haltichella magnidens (Girault, 1917) c g
 Haltichella mboroensis Risbec, 1957 c g
 Haltichella megacerus Schmitz, 1946 c g
 Haltichella melana Schmitz, 1946 c g
 Haltichella nigroclava Roy & Farooqi, 1984 c g
 Haltichella nipponensis Habu, 1960 c g
 Haltichella onatas (Walker, 1843) c g b
 Haltichella ornaticornis Cameron, 1884 c g
 Haltichella perpulcra (Walsh, 1861) c g
 Haltichella rhyacioniae Gahan, 1927 c g b
 Haltichella rufipes (Olivier, 1791) c g
 Haltichella rutshurui Schmitz, 1946 c g
 Haltichella swezeyi Fullaway, 1946 c g
 Haltichella uncinatus Schmitz, 1946 c g
 Haltichella variicolor Masi, 1929 c g
 Haltichella xanticles (Walker, 1843) c g b

Data sources: i = ITIS, c = Catalogue of Life, g = GBIF, b = Bugguide.net

References

Further reading

External links

 

Parasitic wasps
Chalcidoidea